Mikhail Aleksandrovich Bogdanov (17 November 1914 – 20 September 1995) was a Soviet production designer. He was nominated for an Academy Award for Best Art Direction for his work in the epic film War and Peace (1967).

References

External links

Kino-Teatr 

1914 births
1995 deaths
Artists from Vyborg
People from Viipuri Province (Grand Duchy of Finland)
Communist Party of the Soviet Union members
Soviet production designers
People's Artists of the USSR (visual arts)
People's Artists of the RSFSR (visual arts)
Recipients of the Order of Lenin
Burials at Kuntsevo Cemetery
Mass media people from Vyborg